The 2017 Auckland Darts Masters, presented by Burger King & TAB was the third staging of the tournament by the Professional Darts Corporation, as the fourth entry in the 2017 World Series of Darts. The tournament featured 16 players (eight PDC players facing eight regional qualifiers) and was held at The Trusts Arena in Auckland, New Zealand between 11 and 13 August 2017.

Gary Anderson was the defending champion after winning the second edition of the tournament, defeating Adrian Lewis 11–7 in the final, but lost in the first round to Australia's Kyle Anderson 6–4.

Kyle Anderson went on to win his first televised title after defeating compatriot Corey Cadby 11–10 in the final. He became only the 5th player to win a World Series of Darts event after Michael van Gerwen, Phil Taylor, Gary Anderson and Adrian Lewis, as well as being the first regional qualifier to win an event. The final was also the first World Series of Darts final without an invited player.

Prize money
The total prize fund was £60,000.

Qualifiers

The eight invited PDC representatives, sorted according to the World Series Order of Merit, were:

  Gary Anderson (first round)
  Peter Wright (first round)
  Raymond van Barneveld (quarter-finals)
  James Wade (semi-finals)
  Daryl Gurney (quarter-finals)
  Phil Taylor (semi-finals)
  Michael Smith (quarter-finals)
  Simon Whitlock (quarter-finals)

The regional qualifiers were:

Draw

References 

Auckland Darts Masters
Auckland Darts Masters
World Series of Darts
Sport in Auckland
Darts in New Zealand